The Taipei Basin is a geographic region in northern Taiwan. It is the largest basin in Taiwan. The basin is bounded by the Yangmingshan to the north, the Linkou Plateau to the west, and the Ridge of Xueshan Range to the southeast. The shape of the basin is close to a triangle. The three vertices are Nangang, Huilong of Xinzhuang, and Guandu of Beitou.

The main rivers in the Taipei Basin include the Tamsui, Keelung, Dahan and Xindian.

In the prehistoric era, the Taipei Basin was home to Ketagalan tribes. Han Chinese did not settle in the region until the 18th century. Today, Taipei Basin is within the boundaries of Taipei City and New Taipei City and is the largest metropolitan area in Taiwan.

Geology
The Taipei Basin is a subsiding half-graben.

Pollution 
The Taipei Basin rivers are heavily polluted by both raw sewage and industrial pollution from illegal industry. The natural river restoration is on the agenda of the Taipei City Government and several citizen organizations.

See also
 Geography of Taiwan

References

Landforms of Taipei
Drainage basins of Taiwan
Landforms of New Taipei
Drainage basins of the Pacific Ocean